The Congress of Russian Communities (CRC) is a political organization in Russia.  It was created in the early 1990s initially to promote the rights of ethnic Russians living in the newly independent countries of the former Soviet Union.

The group contested a number of elections to the Duma in the 1990s.  In the 1995 Duma election, the group took 4.3% of the vote, just missing the 5% threshold to gain seats.  In 1999 it again failed to pass the 5% threshold, although KRO candidates did win a small number of single-mandate district seats.

In 1996 Alexander Lebed used the KRO as the organisational vehicle for his campaign for the presidency.  Lebed was surprisingly successful, taking 15% of the popular vote and later going on to become governor of Krasnoyarsk Krai.

In 2006 the KRO was revived by Russian nationalist politician Dmitry Rogozin following the merger of his Rodina party into a new Fair Russia coalition.  Rogozin initially stated that he would turn the KRO into a political party to contest the Duma elections in December 2007.

In April 2007 Rogozin announced that he had formed a new party, the Great Russia Party, in conjunction with the nationalist Movement Against Illegal Immigration.  The party would campaign for seats in the Duma and initially stated its support for Alexander Lukashenko's candidacy for the Russian Presidency, a campaign which is impossible as Lukashenko is not a Russian citizen.

Restoration 
On December 9, 2006, the restoration congress of the Russian communities under the new name “ Rodina (“Motherland”): Congress of Russian Communities” was held; Dmitry Rogozin is not officially included in its leadership, but he is an informal leader.

On September 21, 2011, with the participation of Dmitry Rogozin, the constituent congress of the Motherland-Congress of Russian Communities movement was held, at which the organizing committee for the restoration of the Rodina party was established. Dmitry Rogozin accused the leader of the party A Just Russia  Sergey Mironov on raider seizure of the Rodina party. At the congress, Dmitry Rogozin called  the Russian Communities Congress  to become part of the All-Russian People's Front, created in support of presidential candidate Vladimir Putin.

In 2011, the Ministry of Justice officially registered the Congress of Russian Communities.

In April 2012, the organizing committee "Rodina Congress of Russian Communities" submitted to the Ministry of Justice of the Russian Federation a note on the restoration of the political party "Rodina".

Electoral results

Presidential elections

Legislative elections

References

Nationalist parties in Russia
1990 establishments in Russia
Russian nationalist parties
Political parties established in 1990
Far-right political parties in Russia
Right-wing parties in Europe
Conservative parties in Russia
National conservative parties
Right-wing politics in Asia